Pauls may refer to:

Pauls (given name)
Pauls (surname)
Pauls (dairy), Australian dairy brand name
Paüls, municipality in Tarragona, Catalonia, Spain

See also
 Paul (disambiguation)
 Pauls Agriculture
 Pauls Valley
 Paul's